The sodium/glucose cotransporter 2 (SGLT2) is a protein that in humans is encoded by the  (solute carrier family 5 (sodium/glucose cotransporter)) gene.

Function 
SGLT2 is a member of the sodium glucose cotransporter family, which are sodium-dependent glucose transport proteins. SGLT2 is the major cotransporter involved in glucose reabsorption in the kidney.  SGLT2 is located in the early proximal tubule, and is responsible for reabsorption of 80-90% of the glucose filtered by the kidney glomerulus. Most of the remaining glucose absorption is by sodium/glucose cotransporter 1 (SGLT1) in more distal sections of the proximal tubule.

SGLT2 inhibitors for diabetes 

SGLT2 inhibitors are called gliflozins. They lead to a reduction in blood glucose levels, and therefore have potential use in the treatment of type II diabetes. Gliflozins enhance glycemic control as well as reduce body weight and systolic and diastolic blood pressure. The gliflozins canagliflozin, dapagliflozin, and empagliflozin may lead to euglycemic ketoacidosis. Other side effects of gliflozins include increased risk of Fournier gangrene and of (generally mild) genital infections such as candidal vulvovaginitis.

Clinical significance 

Mutations in this gene are also associated with renal glycosuria.

Model organisms 

Model organisms have been used in the study of SLC5A2 function. A conditional knockout mouse line, called Slc5a2tm1a(KOMP)Wtsi was generated as part of the International Knockout Mouse Consortium program — a high-throughput mutagenesis project to generate and distribute animal models of disease to interested scientists. Male and female animals underwent a standardized phenotypic screen to determine the effects of deletion. Twenty-two tests were carried out on homozygous mutant mice and one significant abnormality was observed: males displayed increased drinking behaviour.

See also 

 SGLT Family
 Discovery and development of gliflozins
 Phlorizin - a competitive inhibitor of SGLT1 and SGLT2

References

Further reading 

 
 
 
 
 
 
 

Solute carrier family
Genes mutated in mice